The Platino Award for Best Animated Picture (Spanish: Premio Platino a la mejor película de animación) is one of the Platino Awards, Ibero-America's film awards, presented by the Entidad de Gestión de Derechos de los Productores Audiovisuales (EGEDA) and the Federación Iberoamericana de Productores Cinematográficos y Audiovisuales (FIPCA). It was first presented in 2014, with Argentine-Spanish production Underdogs being the first recipient of the award. Spain holds the record of most wins in the category with seven wins.

2015 winner Boy and the World and 2020 nominee Klaus also received nominations for the Academy Award for Best Animated Feature. 

In the list below the winner of the award for each year is shown first, followed by the other nominees.

Awards and nominations

2010s

2020s

Awards by nation

See also
 Goya Award for Best Animated Film
 Academy Award for Best Animated Feature
 Annie Award for Best Animated Feature – Independent

References

Platino Awards
Awards for best animated feature film